The Barguelonnette (also called Petite Barguelonne, literally Little Barguelonne) is a  long river in the Lot and Tarn-et-Garonne départements, southwestern France. Its source is at Villesèque. It flows generally southwest. It is a right tributary of the Barguelonne into which it flows between Montbarla and Montesquieu.

Départements and communes along its course
This list is ordered from source to mouth: 
Lot: Villesèque, Saint-Pantaléon, Saint-Daunès, Montcuq, Lebreil
Tarn-et-Garonne: Sainte-Juliette, Bouloc, Lauzerte, Montagudet, Saint-Amans-de-Pellagal, Montbarla, Miramont-de-Quercy, Montesquieu,

References

Rivers of France
Rivers of Tarn-et-Garonne
Rivers of Lot (department)
Rivers of Occitania (administrative region)